Cytherus or Kytheros ( or Κύθηρος), also known as Cytherum or Kytheron (Κύθηρον), was one of the twelve cities of ancient Attica, and afterwards a deme. Pausanias states that the nymphs of the river Cytherus in Elis were called Ionides from Ion, the son of Gargettus, when he migrated from Athens to Elis.

The site of Cytherus is located near modern Pousi Kaloyerou.

References

Populated places in ancient Attica
Former populated places in Greece
Ancient Greek cities
Cities in ancient Attica
Demoi